Hugh Segar "Sam" Scorer FRIBA FRSA (2 March 1923 – 6 March 2003) was an English architect who worked in Lincoln, England and was a leading pioneer in the development of hyperbolic paraboloid roof structures using concrete. He also was involved in architectural conservation and research into the work of local 19th-century architects, as well as founding an art gallery in Lincoln, now known as the Sam Scorer Gallery. He held the rare distinction of having two of his buildings listed within his lifetime.

Life
He was brought up in Lincoln, one of five children. His father was a senior partner in a firm of solicitors and later became clerk to Lindsey County Council. His mother was a lecturer at Bishop Grosseteste College, a teacher training college. His great uncle was the Lincoln architect  William Scorer.  A brother was Richard S. Scorer. Between 1936 and 1941 he attended the independent Repton School in south Derbyshire, where he became head boy and excelled at drawing.

He read Mechanical Sciences at Corpus Christi College, Cambridge in 1941, and enjoyed painting as well. In 1942 he was commissioned into the Royal Naval Volunteer Reserve and met his wife in Canada, when training to be a Fleet Air Arm pilot. He served as a fighter pilot until 1945 but was invalided out of service, having crashed while attempting to land on a moving aircraft carrier in the Baltic Sea.

Combining his interest in artwork and mechanical design, he decided to become an architect. He entered the Architectural Association School of Architecture (AA) in the second year in 1946, and graduated in 1949.

He married Anne Humphrey in 1943 in Kingston, Ontario. They had a son and a daughter (who died in April 1986). He lived on Gibraltar Hill in Lincoln. He died in Lincoln County Hospital in March 2003, aged 80.

Away from architecture he was a motor racing enthusiast, attending many of Europe's grand prix circuits. He owned a succession of fast cars, such as a Lotus Elan and various Jaguars, all with his personalised number plate of 'EVL 1'. He held life memberships of the National Trust, The Victorian Society and Reform Club and took an interest in Liberal politics.

Career

He worked for a year as assistant to George Grey Wornum. In 1950, he began work for Denis Clarke Hall (son of Edna Clarke Hall). With Clarke Hall he designed three schools in Lincolnshire in the 1950s:
 William Farr School, Welton (1952)
 Lacey Gardens Junior School, Louth (1953)
 Riddings Comprehensive School, Enderby Road, Scunthorpe (1958 with extensions in 1965–70. Two-storey blocks with the classroom block linked to the service block by a vestibule. The kitchen is screened with a heavily rusticated or embossed wall. Vertical emphasis is provided by a watertower with glazed cistern.
From 1954, his architectural practice, Denis Clarke Hall, Scorer & Bright was based at 7 Lindum Terrace in Lincoln. Scorer was the Chairman of the RIBA East Midlands planning committee. He was the first Chairman of the East Midlands Group of The Victorian Society. In 2000 he founded The Gallery, now known as the Sam Scorer Gallery, in Lincoln.

Hyperbolic paraboloid structures

Thin shell concrete roofs were invented in Germany around the 1920s, as a means of achieving large spans with limited materials and at low cost. The strength of the roof lies in its shape, and the way it carries the loads by the forces exerted in the planes of the shell, rather than by the weight of their materials. The first shell roofs were simple barrel vaults. The earliest  is Wythenshawe Bus Garage, Manchester, built 1939–42. After the Second World War, the form was  taken further. One of the first engineers to specialise in concrete shell techniques in Britain was the German refugee of Hungarian-Jewish origin, Dr K. Hajnal-Kónyi, who arrived in London in 1936, and who  worked with Sam Scorer. Scorer became fascinated by the possibilities of shell roofs as a student, and designed a hyperbolic paraboloid roof in 1956 for a water tower in Ilkeston, Derbyshire. Félix Candela in Mexico  was experimenting with ‘anticlastic’ or shells with double curvatures of opposing convexity and concavity, from which the hyperbolic paraboloid emerged. The form was particularly appropriate for developing countries because of its simple materials and low cost. The rationing of steel in the post-war period in Britain also was reason for the popularity of these designs. The 'hypar', as it is sometimes known, enjoyed a brief fashion, seen in buildings such as the Commonwealth Institute of 1960–2 and also the Wrexham swimming baths of 1964. 
Examples of Scorer's Work are:
 Lincoln Motor Car Company Garage and Showrooms and later used as the headquarters of the Lincolnshire Library service. Designed 1958, built 1959 by Sam Scorer of Denis Clarke Hall, Scorer & Bright; engineer Dr K. Hajnal-Kónyi. Reinforced concrete construction to main former garage, with steel frame and concrete floors to circular corner block and curtain wall elevation to block facing Lucy Tower Street which has flat roof. Rear former garage, has a reinforced concrete hyperbolic paraboloid shell roof, supported on columns to provide a clear unobstructed area. Circular front showroom (now Prezzo) used to display cars.
 Former petrol station at Markham Moor, Nottinghamshire.  This same type of design was used for a petrol station (became a Little Chef restaurant in 1989 but is now a Starbucks' Café) at Markham Moor on the south-bound A1/A57 near Retford, designed in 1959. The shell canopy was designated Grade II listed on 27 March 2012.
 In 1962 he designed the St John the Baptist Church in Ermine, Lincoln. Its aluminium roof is the shape of a hyperbolic paraboloid and the building has a hexagonal floor plan and concrete walls. It is a Grade II* listed building.

Architectural work by Scorer

William Farr Church of England Comprehensive School (1952) Welton.
Lacey Gardens Junior School (1953) Louth.
House and Summerhouse for E.W. Scorer (1955) Lincoln.
7 Gibraltar Hill (1955) Lincoln. His own house.
Extension to the Gartree Secondary Modern School (1956 and 1960) Tattershall, Lincolnshire.
Scunthorpe Steelworks. Laboratory for Richard Thomas and Baldwins (1958) Redbourn Works.  Described by Pevsner and Harris as "an interesting structure with fifteen concrete mushroom pillars. Hence the roof comes down in lobes"  This included murals and designs for Plyglass panels by Tony Bartl. The building appears to have been demolished by 1989.
Riddings Comprehensive School (1958), Scunthorpe. The classroom block linked by a vestibule to the dining room and gym. The kitchen and ancillary rooms are screened by an effective, very heavily rusticated or embossed wall. A tall watertower provides vertical emphasis
Charnos Factory (1959) Ilkeston. Lingerie factory featuring a tank tower that is thought to incorporate the first concrete hyperbolic paraboloid structure in the UK.
Petrol Station (1959–60) Markham Moor, on the A1.
Lincolnshire Motor Company Showrooms (1959–61), Brayford Pool, Lincoln. Later from about 1974 Lincolnshire Libraries headquarters and store. Now restaurants.
St John the Baptist (1963), Ermine Estate, Lincoln.
Lindum House, Montagu Road, Canwick. Converted into a house for Peter and Kari Wright, in 1969– 70. Described as a "former Command Post, barely visible from the kerbside, nestling within an undulating 0.4-acre plot. Only its distinctive triangular ecclesiastical spire window peaks above the horizon. Internally the property has an expansive principal 31 ft (approx) reception room, kitchen/breakfast room, four bedrooms and bathroom".

 Barclay's Bank (1968–70).  Corner of the High Street with the Corn Hill, Lincoln. Tinted glass facades. By Roy Bright of Clarke Hall Scorer & Bright.
 Lucy Tower car-park (1973–4), Brayford Pool, Lincoln.
 Sports Centre (1974), North Hykeham, Lincoln.
The Welding Institute, (1975) Abington, Cambridgeshire. Probably the Richard Weck building on Granta Park, a steel and plate glass structure with internal and external murals by Tony Bartl. This may have been recently demolished (2012–2014), as, despite being in a conservation area, its significance was not appreciated. 
 
Waterside House (1978–9), Waterside North, Lincoln. Environment Agency Building. Red brick on a concrete frame, with recessed mortar joints, detailed with curves and chamfers.

1980s Designed two houses on Spring Hill, Lincoln for the building contractor, Richard Lucas Ltd.
Southern Outfall Pumping Station (1987) Cleethorpes.
Damon's Restaurant (1987–8) Swallowbeck on the junction with the Lincoln Western by-pass. An American burger bar. The up-turned roof structure represents ribs of beef.
Roman Villa (1990s). House. Lincoln.
Damon's Motel (1993) Swallowbeck.
Sam Scorer Gallery, Drury Lane, Lincoln, (2000).

Notes

References
 Times Obituary, 9 April 2003, page 30

Literature
Antram N (revised), Pevsner N & Harris J, (1989), The Buildings of England: Lincolnshire, Yale University Press.

Architectural writing
Kaye D. and Scorer S. (with Introduction and Gazetteer by David Robinson), Fowler of Louth: The Life and Works of James Fowler, Louth Architect 1828–1892, Louth Museum 1992.
Scorer S. (introduction), (1990) The Victorian Facade: William Watkins and son, architects, Lincoln 1858–1918 Lincolnshire College of Art and Design. . Booklet to accompany exhibition at the Usher Gallery, Lincoln.

External links
 Scorer Hawkins Architects
 Sam Scorer Gallery
 His death in Architects Journal
 Sam Scorer; A lesser known architect of the twentieth century; Karolina Szynalska (2010)
Yesterday’s Church of Tomorrow; St. John the Baptist, Ermine Estate by Karolina Szynalska
 Flickr group of his buildings
 Blog description of several buildings, including Damon's restaurant

News items
 Listed structure in May 2012
 Markham Moor restaurant in 2009

 

Alumni of Corpus Christi College, Cambridge
20th-century English architects
People educated at Repton School
Architects from Lincolnshire
People from Lincoln, England
Fleet Air Arm aviators
1923 births
2003 deaths
Fleet Air Arm personnel of World War II
Royal Naval Volunteer Reserve personnel of World War II